There is also an asteroid called 1285 Julietta.

Juliet is an inner satellite of Uranus. It was discovered from the images taken by Voyager 2 on 3 January 1986, and was given the temporary designation S/1986 U 2. It is named after the heroine of William Shakespeare's play Romeo and Juliet. It is also designated Uranus XI.

Juliet belongs to Portia Group of satellites, which also includes Bianca, Cressida, Desdemona, Portia, Rosalind, Cupid, Belinda and Perdita. These satellites have similar orbits and photometric properties. Other than its orbit radius of 53 km and geometric albedo of 0.08, virtually nothing is known about Juliet.

On the Voyager 2 images Juliet appears as an elongated object, the major axis pointing towards Uranus. The ratio of axes of Juliet's prolate spheroid is 0.5 ± 0.3, which is rather an extreme value. Its surface is grey in color.

Juliet may collide with Desdemona within the next 100 million years.

See also 

 Moons of Uranus

References 

Explanatory notes

Citations

External links 
 Juliet Profile by NASA's Solar System Exploration
 Juliet + Ring diagram (Courtesy of Astronomy Magazine 2005)
 Uranus' Known Satellites (by Scott S. Sheppard)

Moons of Uranus
19860103
Moon
Moons with a prograde orbit